Never is a rural locality (a village) in Dyatkovsky District, Bryansk Oblast, Russia. The population was 326 as of 2010. There are 3 streets.

Geography 
Never is located 10 km southeast of Dyatkovo (the district's administrative centre) by road. Lyubokhna is the nearest rural locality.

References 

Rural localities in Dyatkovsky District